Lu is the pinyin and Wade–Giles romanization of the Chinese surname written  in simplified character and  in traditional character. It is also spelled Luk or Loke according to the Hong Kong Cantonese pronunciation. Lu 陆 is the 61st most common surname in China, shared by 4.2 million people. Most people with the surname live in southern China; 44% live in just two provinces: Jiangsu and Guangxi.  Lu 陸 is listed 198th in the Song dynasty classic text Hundred Family Surnames.

Demographics
As of 2013, Lu 陆 is the 61st most common surname in China. It is shared by 4.2 million people, or 0.33% of the Chinese population. Lu 陆 is predominantly a southern surname. Jiangsu province has the highest number of Lu's, accounting for 23% of the national total. Guangxi is a close second, with 21%. Guangdong, Shanghai, Zhejiang, Guizhou, and Anhui, all southern provinces, account for another 33%. Lu 陆 is the 6th most common surname in Guangxi's capital and largest city of Nanning and the 10th most common name in Shanghai.

Origins
According to tradition, there are three main sources of the Lu 陆 surname:

1. From Luzhong (陆终), a great-great-grandson of the legendary emperor Zhuanxu. Luzhong's father Wuhui (吴回) was put in charge of fire by Emperor Ku and given the title of Zhu Rong. Luzhong's clan migrated to Pinglu County, Shanxi, and later moved to Pinglu of Shandong, in present-day Wenshang County.

2. From Luhun (陆浑), a tribe of the Rong nomads who established a state in modern Song County, Henan. In 525 BC, Luhun was annexed by the State of Jin, a major power during the Spring and Autumn period. Many of the Luhun people adopted Lu as their surname.

3. From the Tian (Chen) lineage of the Gui clan (妫), the ruling family of the State of Chen during the Spring and Autumn period. Chen Wan (later called Tian Wan), a prince of Chen, escaped to the State of Qi after losing a power struggle in his home state. Tian Wan's descendants prospered in Qi and eventually usurped the throne of the kingdom, which became known as Tian Qi. During the Warring States period, King Xuan of Qi enfeoffed his youngest son Tian Tong at Lu 陆 (in modern Laoling, Shandong), which was named after a branch of the Luzhong clan. Tian Tong's descendants adopted Lu as their surname.

Later adoption
During the Xianbei Northern Wei dynasty, Emperor Xiaowen (reigned 467–499 AD) implemented a drastic policy of sinicization, ordering his own people to adopt Chinese surnames. The Bulugu (步陆孤) tribe of Xianbei adopted Lu as their surname. The Xianbei people have since completely assimilated into the Han Chinese. The Xianbei Lu later became highly prosperous. Out of the four most prominent Lu 陆 clans in history, which were based in the commanderies of Henan, Henei, Pingyuan, and Wu, two (Henan and Henei) traced their ancestry to the Bulugu tribe.

Notable people
 Lu Gu (陸賈; 240–170 BC), Western Han politician and Confucian scholar
 Lu Xun (Three Kingdoms) (陸遜; 183–245), Eastern Wu general and politician
 Lu Mao (陸瑁; died 239), Eastern Wu politician, Lu Xun's younger brother
 Lu Ji (Gongji) (陸績; 187–219), Eastern Wu official, one of The Twenty-four Filial Exemplars
 Lu Kai (陸凱; 198–269), Eastern Wu politician
 Lu Kang (Three Kingdoms) (陸抗; 226–274), Eastern Wu general, Lu Xun's son
 Lu Ji (Shiheng) (陸機; 261–303), Eastern Wu and Western Jin writer and politician, son of Lu Kang
 Lu Dunxin (陸敦信), Tang dynasty chancellor
 Lu Xiangxian (陸象先; 665–736), Tang dynasty chancellor
 Lu Yu (陸羽; 733–804), Tang dynasty writer, author of The Classic of Tea
 Lu Zhi (Tang dynasty) (陸贄; 754–805), Tang dynasty chancellor
 Lu Yi (陸扆; 847–905), Tang dynasty chancellor
 Lu Guimeng (陸龜蒙; died 881), Tang dynasty poet
 Lu You (陸游; 1125–1209), Southern Song dynasty poet
 Lu Jiuyuan (陸九淵; 1139–1192), Southern Song philosopher
 Lu Xiufu (陸秀夫; 1236–1279), Southern Song chancellor and patriot
 Lu Rong (陸容; 1436–1494), Ming dynasty official and scholar
 Lu Cai (陸采; 1497–1537), Ming dynasty playwright
 Imperial Noble Consort Qinggong, or Lady Lu (1724–1774) imperial consort from the Qing dynasty
 Lu Jianying (陸建瀛; died 1853), Qing dynasty governor
 Loke Yew (陸佑; Lu You; 1845–1917), Malayan businessman and philanthropist
 Lu Rongting (陸榮廷; 1856–1927), Qing dynasty general, and warlord in the Republican period
 Lu Haodong (陸皓東; 1868–1895), late Qing dynasty revolutionary
 Look Tin Eli (陸潤卿, aka Look Tin Sing, Luk Tin-Sun; 1870–1919), successful businessman in San Francisco
 Lou Tseng-Tsiang (陸徵祥; Lu Zhengxiang; 1871–1949), twice served as Premier of the Republic of China
 Lu Zongyu (陸宗輿; 1876–1941), diplomat
 Lu Xiaoman (陆小曼; 1903–1965), painter
 Keye Luke (陸錫麒; 1904–1991), American actor
 Lu Dingyi (陆定一; 1906–1996), politician
 Loke Wan Tho (陆运涛; Lu Yuntao; 1915–1964), founder of the Cathay Organisation
 Wing Luke (陸榮昌; 1925–1965), American politician
 Lu Jiaxi (陆家羲; 1935–1983), mathematician
 Lu Youquan (陆有铨; 1943–2019), education scholar
 Lu Bing (陆兵; born 1944), politician
 Lu Hao (陆浩; born 1947), Communist Party official and administrator
 Christine Loh (陸恭蕙; Lu Gonghui; born 1956), Hong Kong legislator
 Lu Yi-ching (陸弈靜; Lu Yijing; born 1960), Taiwanese actress
 Yadong Luo (陆亚东; Lu Yadong; born 1963), Chinese-American international business professor, scholar and author
 Qi Lu (computer scientist) (陆奇; Lu Qi; born 1961), computer programmer and executive
 Lu Hao (born 1967) (陆昊; born 1967), Governor of Heilongjiang province
 Lu Chuan (陆川; born 1971), filmmaker and screenwriter
 Lu Yi (actor) (陆毅; born 1976), actor and singer
 Lu Li (陆莉; born 1976), gymnast
 Loke Siew Fook or Anthony Loke (陆兆福; born 1977), Malaysian politician
 Luk Koon Pong (陸冠邦; Lu Guanbang; born 1978), Hong Kong football player
 Lu Bofei (陆博飞; born 1979), football player
 Sharon Luk (陸詩韻; Luk Sze-wan; born 1980), Hong Kong actress
 Lu Feng (陆峰; born 1981), football player
 Lu Yong (陆永; born 1986), weightlifter
 Michael Luk (陸志豪; Lu Zhihao; born 1986), Hong Kong-born Canadian football player
 Lu Chunlong (陆春龙; born 1989), gymnast
 Victoria Loke (陆詠怡; born 1992), Singaporean actress
 Lu Ting (陆婷; born 1992), Chinese singer, actress, and member of Chinese idol group SNH48
 Marie Lu, Chinese-American author

References

Chinese-language surnames
Individual Chinese surnames